The Fender Showman was a guitar amplifier produced by the Fender company. It was introduced in 1960 and was discontinued in 1993. Blackface and Silverface models such as the Showman, Dual Showman, and Showman Reverb employed the same "piggyback head" design as the Bandmaster and the Bassman. Dual Showman Reverb used the Fender Twin Reverb chassis and came in non-master and master volume versions with "pull boost" circuitry, mid-1970s "tailless" amplifier decal and a slightly larger head.  The Fender Showman is often associated with surf guitarist Dick Dale and was notably used in the 1960s by The Byrds, The Bobby Fuller Four, Fleetwood Mac with Peter Green, and in the 1970s by Steve Howe of Yes. Jimi Hendrix owned one early model, and later a Dual. Showmans and Dual Showmans are heavily sought by pedal steel guitar players.

Technical data
Six preamplifier tubes, solid state rectifier, four 6L6 power tubes and new output transformer.

AB763 model: three preamplifier tubes (7025 Normal Channel; 7025 & 12AX7 Vibrato Channel), 12AT7 phase inverter tube & 4 x 6L6GC power tubes

Showman models
Showman: 1960–1962 Showman 12 (one 12" JBL D120 speaker), Showman 15 (one 15" JBL D130 speaker) Cream tolex with oxblood grille cloth.
Dual Showman and Showman 15: Starting 1963 (Two 15" JBL D130F speakers for Dual Showman and one 15" JBL D130 speaker for Showman 15, also called Single Showman).
Starting 1960: Cream Tolex with oxblood grille cloth
Starting late 1962: Cream Tolex with gold grille cloth
Starting 1964: Black Tolex with silver grille cloth
Showman Reverb
Dual Showman Reverb
"Red Knob" Showman
Super Showman

References

S